The 1979 California Angels season was their 19th in Major League Baseball. The Angels reached the postseason for the first time by winning the American League West Division with a record of 88–74, three games ahead of the Kansas City Royals in Jim Fregosi's 1st season as manager. The Angels were defeated by the Baltimore Orioles 3–1 in the 1979 American League Championship Series. Don Baylor had an outstanding season, playing in all 162 games, scoring 120 runs (tops in the American League), hitting 36 home runs and driving in 139 runs (also leading the American League) on his way to being named the American League Most Valuable Player, gaining 20 of 28 first place votes.

Offseason 
 December 4, 1978: Ron Jackson and Danny Goodwin were traded by the Angels to the Minnesota Twins for Dan Ford.
 January 9, 1979: 1979 Major League Baseball draft
Al Newman was drafted by the Angels in the 3rd round.
Otis Nixon was drafted by the Angels in the 1st round (4th pick) of the  secondary phase, but did not sign.
 January 29, 1979: Bobby Jones was released by the Angels.
 February 3, 1979: Ken Landreaux, Dave Engle, Paul Hartzell, and Brad Havens were traded by the Angels to the Minnesota Twins for Rod Carew.
 March 27, 1979: Willie Davis was signed by the California Angels as a free agent.

Regular season

Season standings

Record vs. opponents

Notable transactions 
 April 19, 1979: Curt Brown was signed as an amateur free agent by the Angels.
 May 4, 1979: Dave Chalk was traded by the Angels to the Texas Rangers for Bert Campaneris.
 July 31, 1979: Terry Humphrey was released by the Angels.

Roster

Game log 

|- style="text-align:center; background:#fbb;"
| 1 || April 4 || @ Mariners || 4–5 || || || || 37,748 || 0–1 || L1
|- style="text-align:center; background:#fbb;"
| 2 || April 6 || @ Mariners || 6–14 || || || || 8,831 || 0–2 || L2
|- style="text-align:center; background:#bfb"
| 3 || April 7 || @ Mariners || 5–4 || || || || 18,010 || 1–2 || W1
|- style="text-align:center; background:#bfb"
| 4 || April 8 || @ Mariners || 7–5 || || || || 9,183 || 2–2 || W2
|- style="text-align:center; background:#fbb"
| 5 || April 10 || Twins || 1–8 || || || || 33,171 || 2–3 || L1
|- style="text-align:center; background:#bfb"
| 6 || April 11 || Twins || 11–2 || || || || 21,633 || 3–3 || W1
|- style="text-align:center; background:#bfb"
| 7 || April 12 || Twins || 7–1 || || || || 22,211 || 4–3 || W2
|- style="text-align:center; background:#bfb"
| 8 || April 13 || @ Athletics || 10–1 || || || || 2,985 || 5–3 || W3
|- style="text-align:center; background:#bfb"
| 9 || April 14 || @ Athletics || 9–3 || || || || 2,649 || 6–3 || W4
|- style="text-align:center; background:#bfb"
| 10 || April 15 || @ Athletics || 8–1 || || || || 2,243 || 7–3 || W5
|- style="text-align:center; background:#bfb"
| 11 || April 17 || @ Twins || 6–0 || || || || 37,529 || 8–3 || W6
|- style="text-align:center; background:#bfb"
| 12 || April 18 || @ Twins || 11–6 || || || || 3,776 || 9–3 || W7
|- style="text-align:center; background:#bfb"
| 13 || April 19 || @ Twins || 6–4 || || || || 3,537 || 10–3 || W8
|- style="text-align:center; background:#bfb"
| 14 || April 20 || Athletics || 7–4 || || || || 27,417 || 11–3 || W9
|- style="text-align:center; background:#bfb"
| 15 || April 21 || Athletics || 13–1 || || || || 34,728 || 12–3 || W10
|- style="text-align:center; background:#fbb"
| 16 || April 22 || Athletics || 6–7 || || || || 36,130 || 12–4 || L1
|- style="text-align:center; background:#fbb"
| 17 || April 24 || Orioles || 2–7 || || || || 22,343 || 12–5 || L2
|- style="text-align:center; background:#fbb"
| 18 || April 25 || Orioles || 2–5 || || || || 19,939 || 12–6 || L3
|- style="text-align:center; background:#fbb"
| 19 || April 26 || Orioles || 2–4 || || || || 21,598 || 12–7 || L4
|- style="text-align:center; background:#bfb"
| 20 || April 27 || Red Sox || 8–6 || || || || 29,408 || 13–7 || W1
|- style="text-align:center; background:#bfb"
| 21 || April 28 || Red Sox || 5–0 || || || || 41,954 || 14–7 || W2
|- style="text-align:center; background:#fbb"
| 22 || April 29 || Red Sox || 0–2 || || || || 35,206 || 14–8 || L1
|- style="text-align:center; background:#bfb"
| 23 || April 30 || Yankees || 2–1 || || || || 37,180 || 15–8 || W1
|-

|- style="text-align:center; background:#fbb"
| 24 || May 1 || Yankees || 8–12 (11) || || || || 38,858 || 15–9 || L1
|- style="text-align:center; background:#bfb"
| 25 || May 2 || Yankees || 1–0 || || || || 40,648 || 16–9 || W1
|- style="text-align:center; background:#bbb"
|  || May 4 || @ Orioles || colspan=7| Postponed (rain). Makeup: July 19
|- style="text-align:center; background:#fbb"
| 26 || May 5 || @ Orioles || 1–9 || || || || 20,455 || 16–10 || L1
|- style="text-align:center; background:#fbb"
| 27 || May 6 || @ Orioles || 0–6 || || || || 25,630 || 16–11 || L2
|- style="text-align:center; background:#fbb"
| 28 || May 7 || @ Red Sox || 4–9 || || || || 23,319 || 16–12 || L3
|- style="text-align:center; background:#bfb"
| 29 || May 8 || @ Red Sox || 10–2 || || || || 21,160 || 17–12 || W1
|- style="text-align:center; background:#fbb"
| 30 || May 9 || @ Red Sox || 8–9 || || || || 24,815 || 17–12 || L1
|- style="text-align:center; background:#bfb"
| 31 || May 10 || @ Red Sox || 5–3 || || || || 24,990 || 18–13 || W1
|- style="text-align:center; background:#bfb"
| 32 || May 11 || @ Yankees || 4–1 || || || || 37,988 || 19–13 || W1
|- style="text-align:center; background:#fbb"
| 33 || May 12 || @ Yankees || 5–6 || || || || 28,783 || 19–14 || L1
|- style="text-align:center; background:#fbb"
| 34 || May 13 || @ Yankees || 10–12 || || || || 30,083 || 19–15 || L2
|- style="text-align:center; background:#bfb"
| 35 || May 15 || Brewers || 2–1 || || || || 21,235 || 20–15 || W1
|- style="text-align:center; background:#bfb"
| 36 || May 16 || Brewers || 4–3 (11) || || || || 21,533 || 21–15 || W2
|- style="text-align:center; background:#bfb"
| 37 || May 17 || Brewers || 8–5 || || || || 22,060 || 22–15 || W3
|- style="text-align:center; background:#bfb"
| 38 || May 18 || White Sox || 7–3 || || || || 25,598 || 23–15 || W4
|- style="text-align:center; background:#bfb"
| 39 || May 19 || White Sox || 10–6 || || || || 41,941 || 24–15 || W5
|- style="text-align:center; background:#bfb"
| 40 || May 20 || White Sox || 4–0 || || || || 27,189 || 25–15 || W6
|- style="text-align:center; background:#fbb;"
| 41 || May 22 || @ Brewers || 1–7 || || || || 9,857 || 25–16 || L1
|- style="text-align:center; background:#fbb;"
| 42 || May 23 || @ Brewers || 0–1 || || || || 8,408 || 25–17 || L2
|- style="text-align:center; background:#fbb;"
| 43 || May 24 || @ Brewers || 6–7 || || || || 16,314 || 25–18 || L3
|- style="text-align:center; background:#fbb;"
| 44 || May 25 || @ White Sox || 1–6 || || || || 20,554 || 25–19 || L4
|- style="text-align:center; background:#bfb"
| 45 || May 26 || @ White Sox || 8–4 || || || || 31,576 || 26–19 || W1
|- style="text-align:center; background:#bfb"
| 46 || May 27 || @ White Sox || 4–2 || || || || 25,025 || 27–19 || W2
|- style="text-align:center; background:#bfb"
| 47 || May 27 || @ White Sox || 9–1 || || || || 25,025 || 28–19 || W3
|- style="text-align:center; background:#bfb"
| 48 || May 29 || @ Mariners || 6–4 || || || || 4,068 || 29–19 || W4
|- style="text-align:center; background:#bfb"
| 49 || May 30 || @ Mariners || 3–2 || || || || 5,206 || 30–19 || W5
|- style="text-align:center; background:#fbb;"
| 50 || May 31 || @ Mariners || 10–12 || || || || 5,266 || 30–20 || L1
|-

|- style="text-align:center; background:#fbb;"
| 51 || June 1 || Indians || 4–7 || || || || 20,070 || 30–21 || L2
|- style="text-align:center; background:#bfb"
| 52 || June 2 || Indians || 5–2 || || || || 41,969 || 31–21 || W1
|- style="text-align:center; background:#fbb;"
| 53 || June 3 || Indians || 3–5 || || || || 24,409 || 31–22 || L1
|- style="text-align:center; background:#bfb"
| 54 || June 4 || Blue Jays || 4–2 || || || || 16,979 || 32–22 || W1
|- style="text-align:center; background:#bfb"
| 55 || June 5 || Blue Jays || 3–0 || || || || 18,862 || 33–22 || W2
|- style="text-align:center; background:#fbb;"
| 56 || June 6 || Blue Jays || 4–5 || || || || 18,835 || 33–23 || L1
|- style="text-align:center; background:#bfb"
| 57 || June 8 || Tigers || 6–4 || || || || 28,298 || 34–23 || W1
|- style="text-align:center; background:#bfb"
| 58 || June 9 || Tigers || 9–1 || || || || 36,499 || 35–23 || W2
|- style="text-align:center; background:#fbb;"
| 59 || June 10 || Tigers || 7–10 || || || || 30,229 || 35–24 || L1
|- style="text-align:center; background:#bfb"
| 60 || June 11 || @ Indians || 9–4 || || || || 10,674 || 36–24 || W1
|- style="text-align:center; background:#fbb;"
| 61 || June 12 || @ Indians || 10–11 || || || || 9,945 || 36–25 || L1
|- style="text-align:center; background:#fbb;"
| 62 || June 13 || @ Blue Jays || 8–9 || || || || 28,577 || 36–26 || L2
|- style="text-align:center; background:#bfb"
| 63 || June 13 || @ Blue Jays || 10–2 || || || || 28,577 || 37–26 || W1
|- style="text-align:center; background:#bfb"
| 64 || June 14 || @ Blue Jays || 10–2 || || || || 15,097 || 38–26 || W2
|- style="text-align:center; background:#bfb"
| 65 || June 15 || @ Tigers || 8–7 || || || || 41,151 || 39–26 || W3
|- style="text-align:center; background:#bfb"
| 66 || June 16 || @ Tigers || 4–2 || || || || 39,240 || 40–26 || W4
|- style="text-align:center; background:#fbb;"
| 67 || June 17 || @ Tigers || 4–8 || || || || 32,744 || 40–27 || L1
|- style="text-align:center; background:#bfb"
| 68 || June 18 || Rangers || 5–0 || || || || 37,096 || 41–27 || W1
|- style="text-align:center; background:#fbb;"
| 69 || June 19 || Rangers || 1–2 || || || || 26,553 || 41–28 || L1
|- style="text-align:center; background:#bfb"
| 70 || June 20 || Rangers || 5–4 || || || || 26,895 || 42–28 || W1
|- style="text-align:center; background:#fbb;"
| 71 || June 21 || Rangers || 2–3 (11) || || || || 26,422 || 42–29 || L1
|- style="text-align:center; background:#fbb;"
| 72 || June 22 || Royals || 5–9 || || || || 30,737 || 42–30 || L2
|- style="text-align:center; background:#fbb;"
| 73 || June 23 || Royals || 4–13 || || || || 41,002 || 42–31 || L3
|- style="text-align:center; background:#fbb;"
| 74 || June 24 || Royals || 2–5 || || || || 32,210 || 42–32 || L4
|- style="text-align:center; background:#fbb;"
| 75 || June 26 || @ Rangers || 1–2 || || || || 28,695 || 42–33 || L5
|- style="text-align:center; background:#fbb;"
| 76 || June 27 || @ Rangers || 2–4 || || || || 28,899 || 42–34 || L6
|- style="text-align:center; background:#fbb;"
| 77 || June 28 || @ Rangers || 4–14 || || || || 29,101 || 42–35 || L7
|- style="text-align:center; background:#bfb"
| 78 || June 29 || @ Royals || 6–5 (11) || || || || 36,705 || 43–35 || W1
|- style="text-align:center; background:#bfb"
| 79 || June 30 || @ Royals || 8–5 || || || || 41,451 || 44–35 || W2
|-

|- style="text-align:center; background:#bfb"
| 80 || July 1 || @ Royals || 14–2 || || || || 32,636 || 45–35 || W3
|- style="text-align:center; background:#bfb"
| 81 || July 2 || Athletics || 8–3 || || || || 27,639 || 46–35 || W4
|- style="text-align:center; background:#bfb"
| 82 || July 3 || Athletics || 3–0 || || || || 22,498 || 47–35 || W5
|- style="text-align:center; background:#bfb"
| 83 || July 4 || Athletics || 17–6 || || || || 41,958 || 48–35 || W6
|- style="text-align:center; background:#fbb"
| 84 || July 5 || Athletics || 0–3 || || || || 23,793 || 48–36 || L1
|- style="text-align:center; background:#bfb"
| 85 || July 6 || Orioles || 7–3 || || || || 24,679 || 49–36 || W1
|- style="text-align:center; background:#bfb"
| 86 || July 7 || Orioles || 10–1 || || || || 37,382 || 50–36 || W2
|- style="text-align:center; background:#fbb"
| 87 || July 8 || Orioles || 2–7 || || || || 29,062 || 50–37 || L1
|- style="text-align:center; background:#bfb"
| 88 || July 9 || Red Sox || 6–0 || || || || 27,692 || 51–37 || W1
|- style="text-align:center; background:#bfb"
| 89 || July 10 || Red Sox || 4–3 || || || || 36,619 || 52–37 || W2
|- style="text-align:center; background:#fbb"
| 90 || July 11 || Red Sox || 3–9 || || || || 39,210 || 52–38 || L1
|- style="text-align:center; background:#bfb"
| 91 || July 13 || Yankees || 6–1 || || || || 41,805 || 53–38 || W1
|- style="text-align:center; background:#bfb"
| 92 || July 14 || Yankees || 8–7 (12) || || || || 41,693 || 54–38 || W2
|- style="text-align:center; background:#bfb"
| 93 || July 15 || Yankees || 5–4 || || || || 40,739 || 55–38 || W3
|- style="text-align:center; background:#bfb"
| 94 || July 19 || @ Orioles || 4–3 (11) || || || || 33,603 || 56–38 || W1
|- style="text-align:center; background:#fbb"
| 95 || July 19 || @ Orioles || 0–3 || || || || 33,603 || 56–39 || L1
|- style="text-align:center; background:#fbb"
| 96 || July 20 || @ Orioles || 1–2 || || || || 25,682 || 56–40 || L2
|- style="text-align:center; background:#fbb"
| 97 || July 21 || @ Orioles || 2–10 || || || || 51,381 || 56–41 || L3
|- style="text-align:center; background:#fbb"
| 98 || July 22 || @ Red Sox || 5–6 (10) || || || || 35,172 || 56–42 || L4
|- style="text-align:center; background:#bfb"
| 99 || July 23 || @ Red Sox || 9–2 || || || || 35,024 || 57–42 || W1
|- style="text-align:center; background:#fbb"
| 100 || July 24 || @ Yankees || 5–6 || || || || 33,497 || 57–43 || L1
|- style="text-align:center; background:#bfb"
| 101 || July 25 || @ Yankees || 9–5 || || || || 47,449 || 58–43 || W1
|- style="text-align:center; background:#fbb"
| 102 || July 26 || @ Yankees || 0–2 || || || || 43,136 || 58–44 || L1
|- style="text-align:center; background:#fbb"
| 103 || July 27 || Twins || 1–3 || || || || 38,945 || 58–45 || L2
|- style="text-align:center; background:#bfb"
| 104 || July 28 || Twins || 5–0 || || || || 41,891 || 59–45 || W1
|- style="text-align:center; background:#bfb"
| 105 || July 29 || Twins || 9–3 || || || || 33,510 || 60–45 || W2
|- style="text-align:center; background:#fbb;"
| 106 || July 30 || Mariners || 0–8 || || || || 35,548 || 60–46 || L1
|- style="text-align:center; background:#bfb"
| 107 || July 31 || Mariners || 8–1 || || || || 25,198 || 61–46 || W1
|-

|- style="text-align:center; background:#fbb;"
| 108 || August 1 || Mariners || 6–7 || || || || 29,446 || 61–47 || L1
|- style="text-align:center; background:#fbb"
| 109 || August 3 || @ Twins || 1–4 || || || || 30,653 || 61–48 || L2
|- style="text-align:center; background:#bfb"
| 110 || August 4 || @ Twins || 7–1 || || || || 26,084 || 62–48 || W1
|- style="text-align:center; background:#bfb"
| 111 || August 5 || @ Twins || 11–7 || || || || 41,182 || 63–48 || W2
|- style="text-align:center; background:#fbb"
| 112 || August 5 || @ Twins || 1–7 || || || || 41,182 || 63–49 || L1
|- style="text-align:center; background:#bfb"
| 113 || August 6 || @ Athletics || 5–2 || || || || 8,160 || 64–49 || W1
|- style="text-align:center; background:#fbb"
| 114 || August 7 || @ Athletics || 5–9 || || || || 2,905 || 64–50 || L1
|- style="text-align:center; background:#bfb"
| 115 || August 8 || @ Athletics || 8–1 || || || || 3,463 || 65–50 || W1
|- style="text-align:center; background:#fbb;"
| 116 || August 10 || Mariners || 6–8 (14) || || || || 28,969 || 65–51 || L1
|- style="text-align:center; background:#bfb"
| 117 || August 11 || Mariners || 8–1 || || || || 41,940 || 66–51 || W1
|- style="text-align:center; background:#bfb"
| 118 || August 12 || Mariners || 4–3 || || || || 27,345 || 67–51 || W2
|- style="text-align:center; background:#fbb;"
| 119 || August 13 || Tigers || 3–5 || || || || 34,032 || 67–52 || L1
|- style="text-align:center; background:#fbb;"
| 120 || August 14 || Tigers || 3–6 || || || || 29,465 || 67–53 || L2
|- style="text-align:center; background:#fbb;"
| 121 || August 15 || Tigers || 1–6 || || || || 31,885 || 67–54 || L3
|- style="text-align:center; background:#fbb;"
| 122 || August 17 || Blue Jays || 5–6 || || || || 25,050 || 67–55 || L4
|- style="text-align:center; background:#bfb"
| 123 || August 18 || Blue Jays || 7–5 || || || || 30,361 || 68–55 || W1
|- style="text-align:center; background:#bfb"
| 124 || August 19 || Blue Jays || 4–2 || || || || 23,814 || 69–55 || W2
|- style="text-align:center; background:#bfb"
| 125 || August 20 || Indians || 6–5 || || || || 35,497 || 70–55 || W3
|- style="text-align:center; background:#fbb;"
| 126 || August 21 || Indians || 7–12 || || || || 30,902 || 70–56 || L1
|- style="text-align:center; background:#fbb;"
| 127 || August 22 || Indians || 3–13 || || || || 30,625 || 70–57 || L2
|- style="text-align:center; background:#fbb;"
| 128 || August 24 || @ Blue Jays || 4–6 || || || || 18,077 || 70–58 || L3
|- style="text-align:center; background:#bfb"
| 129 || August 25 || @ Blue Jays || 24–2 || || || || 25,207 || 71–58 || W1
|- style="text-align:center; background:#fbb;"
| 130 || August 26 || @ Blue Jays || 3–9 || || || || 22,619 || 71–59 || L1
|- style="text-align:center; background:#fbb;"
| 131 || August 27 || @ Tigers || 2–3 || || || || 22,874 || 71–60 || L2
|- style="text-align:center; background:#fbb;"
| 132 || August 28 || @ Tigers || 2–12 || || || || 19,178 || 71–61 || L3
|- style="text-align:center; background:#fbb;"
| 133 || August 29 || @ Tigers || 1–2 || || || || 19,880 || 71–62 || L4
|- style="text-align:center; background:#fbb;"
| 134 || August 30 || @ Indians || 1–7 || || || || 8,647 || 71–63 || L5
|- style="text-align:center; background:#bfb"
| 135 || August 31 || @ Indians || 9–8 || || || || 10,501 || 72–63 || W1
|-

|- style="text-align:center; background:#bfb"
| 136 || September 1 || @ Indians || 7–4 || || || || 22,804 || 73–63 || W2
|- style="text-align:center; background:#bfb"
| 137 || September 2 || @ Indians || 5–2 || || || || 6,359 || 74–63 || W3
|- style="text-align:center; background:#bfb"
| 138 || September 3 || White Sox || 6–5 || || || || 34,684 || 75–63 || W4
|- style="text-align:center; background:#fbb;"
| 139 || September 4 || White Sox || 7–10 || || || || 26,036 || 75–64 || L1
|- style="text-align:center; background:#bfb"
| 140 || September 5 || White Sox || 9–8 || || || || 23,705 || 76–64 || W1
|- style="text-align:center; background:#bfb"
| 141 || September 6 || White Sox || 10–9 || || || || 20,930 || 77–64 || W2
|- style="text-align:center; background:#bfb"
| 142 || September 7 || Brewers || 6–3 || || || || 30,685 || 78–64 || W3
|- style="text-align:center; background:#bfb"
| 143 || September 8 || Brewers || 3–2 || || || || 37,624 || 79–64 || W4
|- style="text-align:center; background:#bfb"
| 144 || September 9 || Brewers || 5–2 || || || || 27,341 || 80–64 || W5
|- style="text-align:center; background:#fbb;"
| 145 || September 11 || @ White Sox || 7–8 || || || || 6,858 || 80–65 || L1
|- style="text-align:center; background:#fbb;"
| 146 || September 12 || @ White Sox || 5–11 || || || || 7,551 || 80–66 || L2
|- style="text-align:center; background:#bfb"
| 147 || September 14 || @ Brewers || 8–7 || || || || 17,840 || 81–66 || W1
|- style="text-align:center; background:#fbb;"
| 148 || September 15 || @ Brewers || 2–3 || || || || 45,732 || 81–67 || L1
|- style="text-align:center; background:#fbb;"
| 149 || September 16 || @ Brewers || 1–2 || || || || 19,906 || 81–68 || L2
|- style="text-align:center; background:#fbb;"
| 150 || September 17 || @ Royals || 4–16 || || || || 38,327 || 81–69 || L3
|- style="text-align:center; background:#bfb"
| 151 || September 18 || @ Royals || 6–4 || || || || 29,733 || 82–69 || W1
|- style="text-align:center; background:#fbb;"
| 152 || September 19 || @ Royals || 4–6 || || || || 31,412 || 82–70 || L1
|- style="text-align:center; background:#bfb"
| 153 || September 20 || @ Royals || 11–6 || || || || 32,659 || 83–70 || W1
|- style="text-align:center; background:#fbb;"
| 154 || September 21 || Rangers || 1–3 || || || || 37,450 || 83–71 || L1
|- style="text-align:center; background:#bfb"
| 155 || September 22 || Rangers || 3–1 || || || || 33,730 || 84–71 || W1
|- style="text-align:center; background:#bfb"
| 156 || September 23 || Rangers || 6–1 || || || || 41,498 || 85–71 || W2
|- style="text-align:center; background:#bfb"
| 157 || September 24 || Royals || 4–3 || || || || 40,423 || 86–71 || W3
|- style="text-align:center; background:#bfb"
| 158 || September 25 || Royals || 4–1 || || || || 40,631 || 87–71 || W4
|- style="text-align:center; background:#fbb;"
| 159 || September 26 || Royals || 0–4 || || || || 40,565 || 87–72 || L1
|- style="text-align:center; background:#fbb;"
| 160 || September 28 || @ Rangers || 0–5 || || || || 11,965 || 87–73 || L2
|- style="text-align:center; background:#fbb;"
| 161 || September 29 || @ Rangers || 3–6 || || || || 19,167 || 87–74 || L3
|- style="text-align:center; background:#bfb"
| 162 || September 30 || @ Rangers || 11–5 || || || || 9,086 || 88–74 || W1
|-

|- style="text-align:center;"
| Legend:       = Win       = Loss       = PostponementBold = Angels team member

Player stats

Batting

Starters by position 
Note: Pos = Position; G = Games played; AB = At bats; H = Hits; Avg. = Batting average; HR = Home runs; RBI = Runs batted in

Other batters 
Note: G = Games played; AB = At bats; H = Hits; Avg. = Batting average; HR = Home runs; RBI = Runs batted in

Pitching

Starting pitchers 
Note: G = Games pitched; IP = Innings pitched; W = Wins; L = Losses; ERA = Earned run average; SO = Strikeouts

Other pitchers

Relief pitchers 
Note: G = Games pitched; W = Wins; L = Losses; SV = Saves; ERA = Earned run average; SO = Strikeouts

ALCS 

The Baltimore Orioles defeated the Angels, three games to one.

Postseason game log

|- style="text-align:center; background:#ffbbbb;"
| 1 || October 3 || @ Orioles || 3–6 (11) || Stanhouse (1–0) || Montague (0–1) || || 52,787 || 0–1
|- style="text-align:center; background:#ffbbbb;"
| 2 || October 4 || @ Orioles || 8–9 || Flanagan (1–0) || Frost (0–1) || || 52,108 || 0–2
|- style="text-align:center; background:#ccffcc;"
| 3 || October 5 || Orioles || 4–3 || Aase (1–0) || Stanhouse (1–1) || || 43,199 || 1–2
|- style="text-align:center; background:#ffbbbb;"
| 4 || October 6 || Orioles || 0–8 || McGregor (1–0) || Knapp (0–1) || || 43,199 || 1–3
|-

|- style="text-align:center;"
| Legend:       = Win       = Loss       = PostponementBold = Angels team member

Awards and honors
Don Baylor, American League MVP

Farm system 

LEAGUE CHAMPIONS: Salt Lake City

Notes

References

External links 
1979 California Angels team at Baseball-Reference
1979 California Angels at Baseball Almanac

Los Angeles Angels seasons
California Angels season
American League West champion seasons
Los